The 2021–22 Florida Gulf Coast Eagles women's basketball team represented Florida Gulf Coast University during the 2021–22 NCAA Division I women's basketball season. The Eagles, led by twentieth year head coach Karl Smesko, played their home games at the Alico Arena and were members of the Atlantic Sun Conference.

They finished the season 30–3, 15–1 in ASUN play to win the ASUN regular season.  They were the first seed in the ASUN Tournament, and they defeated North Florida, Liberty, and Jacksonville State to win the tournament championship and earn the conference's automatic berth in the NCAA tournament.  In the tournament, they defeated Virginia Tech before falling to Maryland in the Second Round to end their season.

Roster

Schedule

Source

|-
!colspan=6 style=| Non-conference regular season

|-
!colspan=6 style=| ASUN Regular Season

|-
!colspan=6 style=| Atlantic Sun Tournament

|-
!colspan=6 style=| NCAA tournament

Rankings

The Coaches Poll releases a final poll after the NCAA tournament, but the AP Poll does not release a poll at this time.  The Coaches Poll does not release a week 2 poll.

References

Florida Gulf Coast
Florida Gulf Coast Eagles women's basketball seasons
Florida Gulf Coast Eagles women's basketball
Florida Gulf Coast Eagles women's basketball
Florida Gulf Coast